The Mayor of Verona is an elected politician who, along with the Verona's City Council, is accountable for the government of Verona in Veneto, Italy.

The current Mayor of Verona is Damiano Tommasi, a centre-left independent, who took office on 29 June 2022.

Overview

From 1866, when the former Kingdom of Lombardy–Venetia (part of the Austrian Empire) was annexed to the Kingdom of Italy, the central government created the Mayor's office, chosen by City Council.

In 1926, the Fascist Italy replaced the Mayor with a Podestà, chosen by National Fascist Party. After the fall of the Italian Social Republic and the end of the Nazi Germany's occupation, the Mayor was re-established.

From 1994, the Mayor is chosen by the citizens of Verona, originally for a four years term. In 2000 the term was extend to five years.

List

Kingdom of Italy (1866–1946)
In 1866, after the Third War of Independence and the subsequent annexion of Veneto to the Kingdom of Italy, the national government created the office of the Mayor of Verona (Sindaco di Verona), chosen by the City council.
In 1926, the Fascist dictatorship abolished mayors and City councils, replacing them with an authoritarian Podestà chosen by the National Fascist Party.

Republic of Italy (1946–present)

City Council election (1946–1994)
From 1946 to 1994, the Mayor of Verona was chosen by the City Council.

Direct election (since 1994)
Since 1994, enacting a new law on local administrations (1993), the Mayor of Verona is chosen by direct election, originally every four, and since 2002 every five years.

Timeline

Elections

Mayoral and City Council election, 1994
The election took place on two rounds: the first on 12 June, the second on 26 June 1994.

|- style="background-color:#E9E9E9;text-align:center;"
! colspan="4" rowspan="1" style="text-align:left;" | Parties and coalitions
! colspan="1" | Votes
! colspan="1" | %
! colspan="1" | Seats
|-
| style="background-color:lightblue" rowspan="4" |
| style="background-color:" |
| style="text-align:left;" | Forza Italia
| FI
| 45,235 || 28.58 || 14
|-
| style="background-color:"|
| style="text-align:left;" | Lega Nord
| LN
| 28,261 || 17.86 || 9
|-
| style="background-color:" |
| style="text-align:left;" | National Alliance (Alleanza Nazionale)
| AN
| 15,565 || 9.84 || 5
|-
| style="background-color:" |
| style="text-align:left;" | Others
| 
| 1.591 || 1.00 || 0
|- style="background-color:lightblue"
| colspan="4" style="text-align:left;" | Sironi Mariotti coalition (Centre-right)
|  90,652 || 57.28 || 28
|-
| style="background-color:pink" rowspan="4" |
| style="background-color:" |
| style="text-align:left;" | Democratic Party of the Left (Partito Democratico della Sinistra)
| PDS
| 16,157 || 10.21 || 5
|-
| style="background-color:" |
| style="text-align:left;" | Communist Refoundation Party (Rifondazione Comunista)
| PRC
| 6,640 || 4.20 || 2
|-
| style="background-color:" |
| style="text-align:left;" | Federation of the Greens (Federazione dei Verdi)
| FdV
| 5,434 || 3.43 || 1
|-
| style="background-color:" |
| style="text-align:left;" | Others 
| 
| 4,245 || 2.68 || 1
|- style="background-color:pink"
| style="text-align:left;" colspan="4" | Donella coalition (Left)
| 32,476 || 20.52 || 9
|-
| style="background-color:" |
| style="text-align:left;" colspan=2| Italian People's Party (Partito Popolare Italiano)
| PPI
| 24,473 || 15.46 || 7
|-
| style="background-color:" |
| style="text-align:left;" colspan=2| Segni Pact (Patto Segni)
| PS
| 5,315 || 3.36 || 1
|-
| style="background-color:gold" |
| style="text-align:left;" colspan=2| Lega Autonomia Veneta 
| LAV
| 4,308 || 2.72 || 1
|-
| style="background-color:" |
| style="text-align:left;" colspan="2" | Others 
| 
|  1,034 || 0.65 || 0
|-
| colspan="7" style="background-color:#E9E9E9" | 
|- style="font-weight:bold;"
| style="text-align:left;" colspan="4" | Total
| 158,258 || 100.00 || 46
|-
| colspan="7" style="background-color:#E9E9E9" | 
|-
| style="text-align:left;" colspan="4" | Votes cast / turnout 
| 179,612 || 81.97 || style="background-color:#E9E9E9;" |
|-
| style="text-align:left;" colspan="4" | Registered voters
| 219,109 ||  || style="background-color:#E9E9E9;" |
|-
| colspan="7" style="background-color:#E9E9E9" | 
|-
| style="text-align:left;" colspan="7" | Source: Ministry of the Interior
|}

Notes

Mayoral and City Council election, 1998
The election took place on two rounds: the first on 24 May, the second on 7 June 1998.

|- style="background-color:#E9E9E9;text-align:center;"
! colspan="4" rowspan="1" style="text-align:left;" | Parties and coalitions
! colspan="1" | Votes
! colspan="1" | %
! colspan="1" | Seats
|-
| style="background-color:lightblue" rowspan="4" |
| style="background-color:" |
| style="text-align:left;" | Forza Italia
| FI
| 27,774 || 21.60 || 16
|-
| style="background-color:" |
| style="text-align:left;" | National Alliance (Alleanza Nazionale)
| AN
| 10,899 || 8.48 || 6
|-
| style="background-color:" |
| style="text-align:left;" | Christian Democratic Centre (Centro Cristiano Democratico)
| CCD
| 6,741 || 5.24 || 4
|-
| style="background-color:" |
| style="text-align:left;" | United Christian Democrats (Cristiano Democratici Uniti)
| CDU
| 3,762 || 2.93 || 2
|- style="background-color:lightblue"
| colspan="4" style="text-align:left;" | Sironi Mariotti coalition (Centre-right)
|  49,176 || 38.24 || 28
|-
| style="background-color:pink" rowspan="5" |
| style="background-color:" |
| style="text-align:left;" | Democrats of the Left (Democratici di Sinistra)
| DS
| 15,618 || 12.15 || 5
|-
| style="background-color:" |
| style="text-align:left;" | Italian People's Party (Partito Popolare Italiano)
| PPI
| 10,183 || 7.92 || 3
|-
| style="background-color:" |
| style="text-align:left;" | Communist Refoundation Party (Rifondazione Comunista)
| PRC
| 5,223 || 4.06 || 1
|-
| style="background-color:" |
| style="text-align:left;" | Italian Democratic Socialists (Socialisti Democratici Italiani)
| SDI
| 3,983 || 3.10 || 1
|-
| style="background-color:" |
| style="text-align:left;" | Others 
| 
| 4,915 || 3.82 || 0
|- style="background-color:pink"
| style="text-align:left;" colspan="4" | Brugnoli coalition (Centre-left)
| 39,922 || 31.05 || 10
|-
| style="background-color:" |
| style="text-align:left;" colspan=2| Lega Nord 
| LN
| 21,948 || 17.07 || 5
|-
| style="background-color:" |
| style="text-align:left;" colspan="2" | Others 
| 
|  17,547 || 13.65 || 3
|-
| colspan="7" style="background-color:#E9E9E9" | 
|- style="font-weight:bold;"
| style="text-align:left;" colspan="4" | Total
| 128,593 || 100.00 || 46
|-
| colspan="7" style="background-color:#E9E9E9" | 
|-
| style="text-align:left;" colspan="4" | Votes cast / turnout 
| 159,793 || 73.97 || style="background-color:#E9E9E9;" |
|-
| style="text-align:left;" colspan="4" | Registered voters
| 216,014 ||  || style="background-color:#E9E9E9;" |
|-
| colspan="7" style="background-color:#E9E9E9" | 
|-
| style="text-align:left;" colspan="7" | Source: Ministry of the Interior
|}

Mayoral and City Council election, 2002
The election took place on two rounds: the first on 26–27 May, the second on 9–10 June 2002.

|- style="background-color:#E9E9E9;text-align:center;"
! colspan="4" rowspan="1" style="text-align:left;" | Parties and coalitions
! colspan="1" | Votes
! colspan="1" | %
! colspan="1" | Seats
|-
| style="background-color:lightblue" rowspan="4" |
| style="background-color:" |
| style="text-align:left;" | Forza Italia
| FI
| 32,670 || 24.50 || 10
|-
| style="background-color:" |
| style="text-align:left;" | National Alliance (Alleanza Nazionale)
| AN
| 13,154 || 9.86 || 3
|-
| style="background-color:" |
| style="text-align:left;" | Union of the Centre (Unione di Centro)
| UDC
| 9,141 || 6.14 || 2
|-
| style="background-color:" |
| style="text-align:left;" | Lega Nord 
| LN
| 8,191 || 6.14 || 2
|- style="background-color:lightblue"
| colspan="4" style="text-align:left;" | Bolla coalition (Centre-right)
|  63,156 || 47.35 || 17
|-
| style="background-color:pink" rowspan="5" |
| style="background-color:" |
| style="text-align:left;" | The Daisy (La Margherita)
| DL
| 17,366 || 13.02 || 9
|-
| style="background-color:" |
| style="text-align:left;" | Democrats of the Left (Democratici di Sinistra)
| DS
| 16,535 || 12.40 || 9
|-
| style="background-color:orange" |
| style="text-align:left;" | For Verona (Per Verona)
| 
| 11,884 || 8.91 || 6
|-
| style="background-color:pink" |
| style="text-align:left;" | Defend Verona (Difendi Verona)
| 
| 7,067 || 5.30 || 3
|-
| style="background-color:" |
| style="text-align:left;" | Federation of the Greens (Federazione dei Verdi)
| FdV
| 2,461 || 1.85 || 1
|- style="background-color:pink"
| style="text-align:left;" colspan="4" | Zanotto coalition (Centre-left)
| 55,313 || 41.47 || 28
|-
| style="background-color:" |
| style="text-align:left;" colspan=2| Communist Refoundation Party (Rifondazione Comunista)
| PRC
| 4,170 || 3.13 || 1
|-
| style="background-color:" |
| style="text-align:left;" colspan="2" | Others 
| 
|  10,733 || 8.05 || 0
|-
| colspan="7" style="background-color:#E9E9E9" | 
|- style="font-weight:bold;"
| style="text-align:left;" colspan="4" | Total
| 133,372 || 100.00 || 46
|-
| colspan="7" style="background-color:#E9E9E9" | 
|-
| style="text-align:left;" colspan="4" | Votes cast / turnout 
| 157,382 || 74.14 || style="background-color:#E9E9E9;" |
|-
| style="text-align:left;" colspan="4" | Registered voters
| 212,284 ||  || style="background-color:#E9E9E9;" |
|-
| colspan="7" style="background-color:#E9E9E9" | 
|-
| style="text-align:left;" colspan="7" | Source: Ministry of the Interior
|}

Notes

Mayoral and City Council election, 2007
The election took place on 27–28 May 2007.

|- style="background-color:#E9E9E9;text-align:center;"
! colspan="4" rowspan="1" style="text-align:left;" | Parties and coalitions
! colspan="1" | Votes
! colspan="1" | %
! colspan="1" | Seats
|-
| style="background-color:lightblue" rowspan="6" |
| style="background-color:blue" |
| style="text-align:left;" | Tosi List (Lista Tosi)
| 
| 22,482 || 16.38 || 8
|-
| style="background-color:" |
| style="text-align:left;" | Forza Italia
| FI
| 20,681 || 15.07 || 8
|-
| style="background-color:" |
| style="text-align:left;" | National Alliance (Alleanza Nazionale)
| AN
| 17,861 || 13.02 || 6
|-
| style="background-color:" |
| style="text-align:left;" | Lega Nord
| LN
| 16,417 || 11.96 || 6
|-
| style="background-color:" |
| style="text-align:left;" | Union of the Centre (Unione di Centro)
| UDC
| 6,277 || 4.57 || 2
|-
| style="background-color:" |
| style="text-align:left;" | Others
| 
| 925 || 0.67 || 0
|- style="background-color:lightblue"
| colspan="4" style="text-align:left;" | Tosi coalition (Centre-right)
| 84,643 || 61.68 || 30
|-
| style="background-color:pink" rowspan="4" |
| style="background-color:" |
| style="text-align:left;" | The Olive Tree (L'Ulivo)
| 
| 23,860 || 17.39 || 10
|-
| style="background-color:orange" |
| style="text-align:left;" | Zanotto List (Lista Zanotto)
| 
| 12,805 || 9.33 || 5
|-
| style="background-color:" |
| style="text-align:left;" | Party of Italian Communists (Partito dei Comunisti Italiani)
| PdCI
| 2,743 || 2.00 || 1
|-
| style="background-color:" |
| style="text-align:left;" | Others 
| 
| 5,183 || 3.77 || 0
|- style="background-color:pink"
| style="text-align:left;" colspan="4" | Zanotto coalition (Centre-left)
| 44,591 || 32.49 || 16
|-
| style="background-color:" |
| style="text-align:left;" colspan="2" | Others 
| 
|  7,991 || 5.83 || 0
|-
| colspan="7" style="background-color:#E9E9E9" | 
|- style="font-weight:bold;"
| style="text-align:left;" colspan="4" | Total
| 137,225 || 100.00 || 46
|-
| colspan="7" style="background-color:#E9E9E9" | 
|-
| style="text-align:left;" colspan="4" | Votes cast / turnout 
| 157,378 || 76.69 || style="background-color:#E9E9E9;" |
|-
| style="text-align:left;" colspan="4" | Registered voters
| 205,207 ||  || style="background-color:#E9E9E9;" |
|-
| colspan="7" style="background-color:#E9E9E9" | 
|-
| style="text-align:left;" colspan="7" | Source: Ministry of the Interior
|}

Mayoral and City Council election, 2012
The election took place on 6–7 May 2012.

|- style="background-color:#E9E9E9;text-align:center;"
! colspan="4" rowspan="1" style="text-align:left;" | Parties and coalitions
! colspan="1" | Votes
! colspan="1" | %
! colspan="1" | Seats
|-
| style="background-color:lightblue" rowspan="3" |
| style="background-color:blue" |
| style="text-align:left;" | Tosi List (Lista Tosi)
| 
| 45,327 || 37.22 || 17
|-
| style="background-color:" |
| style="text-align:left;" | Lega Nord
| LN
| 13,065 || 10.73 || 5
|-
| style="background-color:" |
| style="text-align:left;" | Others
| 
| 8,728 || 7.09 || 0
|- style="background-color:lightblue"
| colspan="4" style="text-align:left;" | Tosi coalition (Right)
|  67,030 || 55.04 || 22
|-
| style="background-color:pink" rowspan="3" |
| style="background-color:" |
| style="text-align:left;" | Democratic Party (Partito Democratico)
| PD
| 18,075 || 14.84 || 6
|-
| style="background-color:" |
| style="text-align:left;" | Left Ecology Freedom (Sinistra Ecologia Libertà)
| SEL
| 3,260 || 2.68 || 2
|-
| style="background-color:" |
| style="text-align:left;" | Others 
| 
| 7,030 || 5.77 || 0
|- style="background-color:pink"
| style="text-align:left;" colspan="4" | Bertucco coalition (Centre-left)
| 28,365 || 23.29 || 8
|-
| style="background-color:" |
| style="text-align:left;" colspan="2" |Five Star Movement (Movimento Cinque Stelle)
| M5S
| 11,584 || 9.51 || 3
|-
| style="background-color:lightblue" rowspan="3" |
| style="background-color:" |
| style="text-align:left;" | The People of Freedom (Il Popolo della Libertà) 
| PdL
| 6,447 || 5.29 || 2
|-
| style="background-color:" |
| style="text-align:left;" | Union of the Centre (Unione di Centro) 
| UDC
| 4,075 || 3.35 || 1
|-
| style="background-color:" |
| style="text-align:left;" | Others
| 
| 2,546 || 2.09 || 0
|- style="background-color:lightblue"
| colspan="4" style="text-align:left;" | Castelletti coalition (Centre-right)
|  13,068 || 10.73 || 3
|-
| style="background-color:" |
| style="text-align:left;" colspan="2" | Others 
| 
|  1,730 || 1.42 || 0
|-
| colspan="7" style="background-color:#E9E9E9" | 
|- style="font-weight:bold;"
| style="text-align:left;" colspan="4" | Total
| 121,777 || 100.00 || 36
|-
| colspan="7" style="background-color:#E9E9E9" | 
|-
| style="text-align:left;" colspan="4" | Votes cast / turnout 
| 139,531 || 69.65 || style="background-color:#E9E9E9;" |
|-
| style="text-align:left;" colspan="4" | Registered voters
| 200,338 ||  || style="background-color:#E9E9E9;" |
|-
| colspan="7" style="background-color:#E9E9E9" | 
|-
| style="text-align:left;" colspan="7" | Source: Ministry of the Interior
|}

Mayoral and City Council election, 2017
The election took place on two rounds: the first on 11 June, the second on 25 June 2017.

|- style="background-color:#E9E9E9;text-align:center;"
! colspan="4" rowspan="1" style="text-align:left;" | Parties and coalitions
! colspan="1" | Votes
! colspan="1" | %
! colspan="1" | Seats
|-
| style="background-color:lightblue" rowspan="5" |
| style="background-color:darkblue"|
| style="text-align:left;" | Sboarina List (Lista Sboarina)
| 
| 14,978 || 13.63 || 11
|-
| style="background-color:" |
| style="text-align:left;" | Lega Nord 
| LN
| 9,704 || 8.83 || 7
|-
| style="background-color:" |
| style="text-align:left;" | Forza Italia 
| FI
| 3,763 || 3.42 || 2
|-
| style="background-color:" |
| style="text-align:left;" | Brothers of Italy (Fratelli d'Italia)
| FdI
| 2,991 || 2.72 || 2
|-
| style="background-color:" |
| style="text-align:left;" | Others
| 
| 1,158 || 1.05 || 0
|- style="background-color:lightblue"
| colspan="4" style="text-align:left;" | Sboarina coalition (Centre-right)
|  32,594 || 29.65 || 22
|-
| style="background-color:lightblue" rowspan="4" |
| style="background-color:blue" |
| style="text-align:left;" | Tosi List (Lista Tosi)
| 
| 17,969 || 16.35 || 4
|-
| style="background-color:lightblue" |
| style="text-align:left;" | Love Verona (Ama Verona) 
| AV
| 4,614 || 4.20 || 1
|-
| style="background-color:yellow"|
| style="text-align:left;" | Act! (Fare!)
| F!
| 3,025 || 2.75 || 0
|-
| style="background-color:" |
| style="text-align:left;" | Others
| 
| 1,037 || 0.94 || 0
|- style="background-color:lightblue"
| colspan="4" style="text-align:left;" | Bisinella coalition (Centre-right)
|  26,645 || 24.24 || 5
|-
| style="background-color:pink" rowspan="3" |
| style="background-color:" |
| style="text-align:left;" | Democratic Party (Partito Democratico)
| PD
| 17,406 || 15.83 || 4
|-
| style="background-color:orange" |
| style="text-align:left;" | Civic Verona (Verona Civica)
| VC
| 5,579 || 5.08 || 1
|-
| style="background-color:" |
| style="text-align:left;" | Others 
| 
| 943 || 0.86 || 0
|- style="background-color:pink"
| style="text-align:left;" colspan="4" | Salemi coalition (Centre-left)
| 23,928 || 21.77 || 5
|-
| style="background-color:" |
| style="text-align:left;" colspan="2" |Five Star Movement (Movimento Cinque Stelle)
| M5S
|  10,386 || 9.45 || 2
|-
| style="background-color:darkblue" |
| style="text-align:left;" colspan="2" | Clean Verona (Verona Pulita)
| VP
|  5,315 || 4.84 || 1
|-
| style="background-color:" |
| style="text-align:left;" colspan="2" | Verona in Common (Verona in Comune)
| ViC
|  4,824 || 4.39 || 1
|-
| style="background-color:" |
| style="text-align:left;" colspan="2" | Others 
| 
|  6,231 || 5.67 || 0
|-
| colspan="7" style="background-color:#E9E9E9" | 
|- style="font-weight:bold;"
| style="text-align:left;" colspan="4" | Total
| 109,923 || 100.00 || 36
|-
| colspan="7" style="background-color:#E9E9E9" | 
|-
| style="text-align:left;" colspan="4" | Votes cast / turnout 
| 118,076 || 58.81 || style="background-color:#E9E9E9;" |
|-
| style="text-align:left;" colspan="4" | Registered voters
| 200,767 ||  || style="background-color:#E9E9E9;" |
|-
| colspan="7" style="background-color:#E9E9E9" | 
|-
| style="text-align:left;" colspan="7" | Source: Ministry of the Interior
|}

Mayoral and City Council election, 2022
The election took place on two rounds: the first on 12 June, the second on 26 June 2022.

|- style="background-color:#E9E9E9;text-align:center;"
! colspan="4" rowspan="1" style="text-align:left;" | Parties and coalitions
! colspan="1" | Votes
! colspan="1" | %
! colspan="1" | Seats
|-
| style="background-color:pink" rowspan="5" |
| style="background-color:gold" |
| style="text-align:left;" | Tommasi List (Lista Tommasi)
| 
| 16,452 || 15.97 || 10
|-
| style="background-color:" |
| style="text-align:left;" | Democratic Party (Partito Democratico)
| PD
| 13,500 || 13.10 || 8
|-
| style="background-color:red" |
| style="text-align:left;" | Goals (Traguardi)
| 
| 5,724 || 5.55 || 3
|-
| style="background-color:darkred" |
| style="text-align:left;" | Civic Ecologic Left (Sinistra Civica Ecologista)
| SCE
| 2,619 || 2.54 || 1
|-
| style="background-color:" |
| style="text-align:left;" | Others 
| 
| 1,378 || 2.30 || 0
|- style="background-color:pink"
| style="text-align:left;" colspan="4" | Tommasi coalition (Centre-left)
| 40,673 || 39.47 || 22
|-
| style="background-color:lightblue" rowspan="5" |
| style="background-color:" |
| style="text-align:left;" | Brothers of Italy (Fratelli d'Italia)
| FdI
| 12,278 || 11.91 || 4
|-
| style="background-color:darkblue"|
| style="text-align:left;" | Sboarina List (Lista Sboarina)
| 
| 7,548 || 7.32 || 2
|-
| style="background-color:" |
| style="text-align:left;" | League (Lega) 
| L
| 6,797 || 6.60 || 1
|-
| style="background-color:" |
| style="text-align:left;" | Coraggio Italia 
| CI
| 5,381 || 5.22 || 1
|-
| style="background-color:" |
| style="text-align:left;" | Others
| 
| 2,397 || 2.32 || 0
|- style="background-color:lightblue"
| colspan="4" style="text-align:left;" | Sboarina coalition (Right)
|  34,401 || 33.38 || 8
|-
| style="background-color:lightblue" rowspan="4" |
| style="background-color:blue" |
| style="text-align:left;" | Tosi List (Lista Tosi)
| 
| 10,937 || 10.61 || 4
|-
| style="background-color:yellow"|
| style="text-align:left;" | Act! (Fare!)
| F!
| 4,548 || 4.41 || 1
|-
| style="background-color:" |
| style="text-align:left;" | Forza Italia 
| FI
| 4,479 || 4.35 || 1
|-
| style="background-color:" |
| style="text-align:left;" | Others
| 
| 4,306 || 4.18 || 0
|- style="background-color:lightblue"
| colspan="4" style="text-align:left;" | Tosi coalition (Centre-right)
|  24,270 || 23.55 || 6
|-
| style="background-color:" |
| style="text-align:left;" colspan="2" | Others 
| 
|  3,728 || 3.61 || 0
|-
| colspan="7" style="background-color:#E9E9E9" | 
|- style="font-weight:bold;"
| style="text-align:left;" colspan="4" | Total
| 103,049 || 100.00 || 36
|-
| colspan="7" style="background-color:#E9E9E9" | 
|-
| style="text-align:left;" colspan="4" | Votes cast / turnout 
| 111,606 || 55.08 || style="background-color:#E9E9E9;" |
|-
| style="text-align:left;" colspan="4" | Registered voters
| 202,638 ||  || style="background-color:#E9E9E9;" |
|-
| colspan="7" style="background-color:#E9E9E9" | 
|-
| style="text-align:left;" colspan="7" | Source: Ministry of the Interior
|}

See also
 Timeline of Verona

References

Verona
Mayors of places in Veneto
People from Verona
Politics of Veneto